Attila György (born 15 August 1971, Miercurea Ciuc, Harghita County, Romania), is a Székely writer, journalist, and literary editor. He has received the Attila József Prize for excellence in Hungarian literature.

Biography
György graduated from the Miercurea Ciuc School of Mathematics and Physics (now Márton Áron Gymnasium). Between 1991 and 1997, he was a journalist and editor for such publications as Ifi Fórum, If, Zabhegyező, and Erdélyi Napló. Since 1997, he has been editor of the cultural journal Székelyföld. In 1999, he edited the Transylvanian professional journal Könyvjelző, and the Internet portal Internetto Transsylvaniae.

His short stories, novellas and journalism appear regularly in the Romanian and Hungarian press. He is a member of the Hungarian Writers' Association and the Young Writers' Association, and is a former Intendant of the Transylvanian Hungarian Writers' League.

On 15 March 1999 in Budapest, he was awarded the Attila József Prize, recognizing excellence in contributions to Hungarian literature. It was presented by Miklós Réthelyi, Hungarian Minister of National Resources.

Chief works 
Ki olyan mint a Sárkány (Who Is Like the Dragon?), short story collection; 1995, Miercurea Ciuc, Kájoni Kiadó
A boszorkányok feltámadása (The Resurrection of the Witches), novella; 1997, Cluj-Napoca, Erdélyi Híradó
Történetek a nyereg alól (Tales from Beneath the Saddle), short story collection; 1999, Miercurea Ciuc, Pro-Print Kiadó
Harminchárom (Thirty-three), novel; 2002, Budapest, Magyar Könyvklub
Harcosok Könyve (The Book of the Warriors); 2005, Arad, Irodalmi Jelen Kiadó
Az én státusom (My Own Status), journalism; 2005, Târgu Secuiesc, Havas Kiadó
Hajós a kikötőben (Boat in the Harbor); 2009, Šamorín, Slovakia, Méry Ratio Kiadó

Prizes and awards 
Award of the Association of Hungarian Journalists in Romania
András Bálint Memorial Prize
Curator's Prize, Tokay Writers' Workshop 2002
Attila József Prize, 2011

References
The information in this article is based on that in its Hungarian equivalent.

External links 
A Székelyföld kulturális havilap és a Hargita Kiadó impresszuma 

People from Miercurea Ciuc
Romanian people of Hungarian descent
Hungarian-language writers
1971 births
Living people
Attila József Prize recipients